American country music singer and songwriter Jake Owen has released six studio albums, two extended plays, one compilation album, and 21 singles. Signed to RCA Nashville in 2006, he made his chart debut that same year with "Yee Haw". Of Owen's 21 singles, nine have reached number one on the US country charts: "Barefoot Blue Jean Night", "Alone with You", "The One That Got Away", and "Anywhere with You", all from his third studio album, Barefoot Blue Jean Night; "Beachin'" from his fourth studio album, Days of Gold; "American Country Love Song" from his fifth studio album, American Love, and "I Was Jack (You Were Diane)" and "Homemade" from his sixth studio album, Greetings from... Jake.

Studio albums

Compilation albums

Extended plays

Singles

Other singles

Featured singles

Other charted songs

Other appearances

Music videos

Notes

References

Country music discographies
Discographies of American artists